The pound was the currency of Virginia until 1793. Initially, sterling coin circulated along with foreign currencies, supplemented from 1755 by local paper money. Although these notes were denominated in £sd, they were worth less than sterling, so 1 Virginia shilling was equal to 9d sterling.

Colonial legislation
In 1645 the legislature of the Colony of Virginia prohibited barter, and valued the Spanish dollar or piece of eight at 6/–. The 1655 legislature officially devalued the Spanish dollar to 5/-.

Virginia coinage
The first "official" coinage in British North America was issued by the Province of Virginia in 1775, although they were dated 1773. The reason was that the Virginia House of Burgesses had been requesting the coinage for several years and King George III finally consented in that year.

Five tons of coins were sent to the colony on the clipper ship Virginia and most of the coins were distributed just before the breakout of the American Revolution in April 1775. They are considered to be the most affordable Colonial American coinage.

Continental currency
The State of Virginia issued Continental currency denominated in £sd and Spanish dollars, with 1 dollar = 6/–. The continental currency was replaced by the U.S. dollar at a rate of 1000 continental dollars = 1 U.S. dollar.

References

Notes

Bibliography 
Newman, Eric P. The Early Paper Money of America. 5th edition. Iola, Wisconsin: Krause Publications, 2008. .

Further reading

Historical currencies of the United States
1793 disestablishments in the United States
Pre-statehood history of Virginia
Economy of Virginia